Jan Guryca (born October 28, 1982) is a French professional ice hockey goaltender. He is currently playing for Straubing Tigers in the Deutsche Eishockey Liga (DEL).

References

External links

1982 births
Living people
French ice hockey goaltenders
Straubing Tigers players
People from Chamonix
Sportspeople from Haute-Savoie